Typha azerbaijanensis  is a plant species endemic to northeastern Iran. The name refers not to the independent Republic of Azerbaijan  but rather to the Azerbaijan region in northeastern Iran. The species grows in freshwater marshes. Type collection was made between Khoy and Marand at an elevation of about 1100 m.

References

azerbaijanensis
Freshwater plants
Endemic flora of Iran
Plants described in 2003